Samuel Anderson (1773January 17, 1850) was an American politician from Pennsylvania who served as an Adams Party member of the U.S. House of Representatives from Pennsylvania's 4th congressional district from 1827 to 1829.  He served as a member of the Pennsylvania House of Representatives from 1815 to 1818 and again from 1823 to 1825.

During the War of 1812, Anderson raised a group of volunteers known as the Mifflin Guards and served as captain.  He continued to serve in the Pennsylvania militia and was promoted to lieutenant colonel in 1821.

Early life and education
Samuel Anderson was born in Middletown in the Province of Pennsylvania to Reverend James and Margaret (McDowell) Anderson.  He studied medicine and was admitted to practice in 1796.

Military career
In July 1799, he was appointed by President John Adams as surgeon's mate in the U.S. Navy.  A month later, he was commissioned surgeon and assigned to duty under Captain David Porter, who was a personal friend of the doctor.  He resigned his commission and in 1801 settled in Chester, Pennsylvania, where he continued the practice of medicine.

During the War of 1812, Anderson raised a group of volunteers known as the Mifflin Guards.  He was commissioned captain on September 10, 1814 and served for three months at Fort DuPont.  He served in the Pennsylvania Militia and was promoted to the rank of lieutenant colonel in the One Hundredth Regiment, Second Brigade, Third Division, on August 3, 1821.

In 1823, Anderson was recalled to active duty in the Navy and was assigned to the West Indies Squadron commanded by Commodore Porter.  In 1824, he was surgeon on the USS Hornet and later the same year on the USS Decoy stationed at Matanzas, Cuba.

Political career
Anderson was elected as a Federalist member of the Pennsylvania House of Representatives from 1815 to 1818 and 1823 to 1825.  He served as sheriff of Delaware County, Pennsylvania, from 1819 to 1823.

In 1827, Anderson was elected to the Twentieth Congress to represent Pennsylvania's 4th congressional district and served until 1829.

He was reelected as a Democratic member of the Pennsylvania House of Representatives from 1829 to 1830.  He was reelected as a Republican member of the Pennsylvania House of Representatives in 1831 and served until 1835.

In 1832, Anderson was elected as the 60th Speaker of the Pennsylvania House of Representatives.  During his Speakership, he signed important bills on road construction as well as canal and railroad incorporation and regulation.

In 1840, Anderson was appointed Inspector of Customs at the Lazaretto in Tinicum Township, Pennsylvania and served until 1845.  He was elected justice of the peace in 1846 and served until his death in 1850.

Personal life
In 1802, Anderson married Sarah Richards and together they had six children.

Anderson died in Chester, Pennsylvania in 1850 and is interred at the Middletown Presbyterian Cemetery in Elwyn, Pennsylvania.

References

1773 births
1850 deaths
American militiamen in the War of 1812
Burials in Pennsylvania
Members of the Pennsylvania House of Representatives
National Republican Party members of the United States House of Representatives from Pennsylvania
Pennsylvania sheriffs
People of colonial Pennsylvania
Speakers of the Pennsylvania House of Representatives
United States Navy officers
American militia officers